The  on June 18, 1945, was part of the strategic bombing campaign waged by the United States against military and civilian targets and population centers during the Japan home islands campaign in the closing stages of World War II.

Background
Although the city of Yokkaichi was not a major regional industrial and commercial center when compared with nearby Nagoya, it had port facilities of military significance, as well as a major oil refinery complex operated by the Imperial Japanese Navy. The Kansai Main Line railway connecting Nagoya with Osaka also ran through the city.

Air raids
Yokkaichi was bombed a total of nine times during World War II. The first air raid, on 0045 hours on 18 June 1945 was the most severe. A total of 89 B-29 Superfortress bombers of the United States Army Air Force’s 313rd Bombardment Wing targeted the center of the city with a major firebombing attack rather than its military and industrial zones on the outskirts. A total of 11,272 incendiary bombs were dropped (567.3 tons), killing 736 civilians, wounding 1500 others, with 63 persons missing and 47,153 people left homeless. A year after the war, the United States Army Air Forces's Strategic Bombing Survey (Pacific War) reported that 35 percent of the city had been destroyed.

Yokkaichi was attacked again on 22 June, 26 June, 9 July, 24 July, 28 July, 30 July, 2 August and on 8 August. During these latter attacks, the factories and oil refineries were destroyed. During one of these final attacks, Pumpkin bombs were dropped as part of a rehearsal for the atomic bombing of Japan.

See also
Strategic bombing during World War II

References

Notes

External links
67 Japanese Cities Firebombed in World War II

Yokkaichi
 Japan in World War II
Yokkaichi
Yokkaichi
Yokkaichi
1945 in Japan
 History of Mie Prefecture
 Firebombings in Japan